One Piece: Grand Battle, is a fighting game made in Japan based on the anime and manga series One Piece. It is the fourth and final game in One Piece's Grand Battle series and the nineteenth One Piece video game released. The game was released in Japan as  The English version uses the intro from the TV series.

Plot
Much like the manga and anime it is based on, Monkey D. Luffy wants to take Gol D. Roger's place to become King of the Pirates. Together with his crew namely, Roronoa Zoro, Nami, Usopp, Sanji, Chopper, and Nico Robin are on a quest to search for the great treasure  and also to fulfill their own dreams. The story is based on the East Blue saga up to the Foxy's Return arc.

Gameplay
There are four different modes in the game: Grand Battle, a one-player/two player mode that features unlocked fighters and stages; Story Mode, a mode that follows every character through the story; Training, a testing mode to test one's skill; and Tourney, a tournament mode that allows to select a character and fight in it and baseball mode.

Returning Characters
 Monkey D. Luffy
 Roronoa Zoro
 Nami
 Usopp
 Vinsmoke Sanji (written as "Sanji")
 Tony Tony Chopper
 Nico Robin
 Kuro
 Don Krieg
 Arlong
 Buggy
 Chaser
 Mr. 0 Crocodile
 Bentham (written as "Mr. 2 Bon Clay")
 Mihawk
 Shanks
Enel

New Characters
Foxy
Aokiji

Sequel

The Sequel of One Piece: Grand Battle entitled One Piece: Grand Adventure, which in Grand Adventure, you play along with 5 captains. Luffy is Easy, Buggy is Normal, Crocodile is Hard, Chaser/Smoker is Insane and especially Usopp is Pirate Panic (from level 40-100).

Reception

The game received "average" reviews on both platforms according to the review aggregation website Metacritic. In Japan, Famitsu gave both platforms a score of three sevens and one six for a total of 27 out of 40.

GameSpot awarded it a score of 6.0 out of 10, saying "Fans of the series will love One Piece's visuals but will be disappointed with just about every other aspect of the game." IGN awarded it 7 out of 10, saying "In the end, One Piece: Grand Battle is a fun game marred by a lack of innovation."

Notes

References

External links
 
 Bandai America's Official Website (archived)
 One Piece Grand Battle RUSH! (Japanese)

2005 video games
Atari games
Bandai games
GameCube games
Ganbarion games
Multiplayer and single-player video games
Grand Battle
PlayStation 2 games
Toei Animation video game projects
Video games developed in Japan
Video games with cel-shaded animation